Ağrı İbrahim Çeçen University (ICUA) is a public higher educational institution located in Ağrı, Eastern Anatolia in Turkey. It was formerly the Faculty of Education linked to the Atatürk University of Erzurum.

In 2007, the facility was developed to a university named Ağrı Dağı University (Turkish for Mount Ararat University). The university was later renamed following a protocol signed between the government and a local businessman and philanthropist İbrahim Çeçen.

The university has six faculties, two institutes, five colleges, five vocational schools and five research and application centers.

The university is a member of the Caucasus University Association.

History 
The opening of the university was on 27 May 2007 as Ağrı Dağı University. On 28 June 2008, the university was renamed after its refounder – İbrahim Çeçen.u

As a civil engineer and businessman his name was given to the university and its name was changed to Ağrı İbrahim Çeçen University (ICUA). Deputy rector was Prof. Dr. Yaşar SÜtbeyaz then Prof. Dr. Irfan ASLAN was appointed as the first rector in 2008.

At the start, the university had only one faculty – the faculty of Education. The board of professors and lecturers numbered 18, and the student body was 1200. Today the number of professors involved in teaching and training is around 300, including 59 academicians and 259 corresponding members of the academy, and nine thousand students pursue their degrees at 12 regional branches of the university.

ICUA today
Today ICUA is the 4th largest university in Eastern Anatolia. It has two campuses, one central laboratory for scientific-research and study-scientific institutes, four scientific-research laboratories and centers, 12 study laboratories and rooms, and two libraries.

ICUA schools
Schools at ICUA are the School of The Vocational School, Faculty of Science and Letters, Faculty of Education, Faculty of Economics and Administrative Sciences, Vocational Health School.

Teaching and working language
Turkish is the official language of Turkey. Beyond Turkish boundaries, the language is widespread in Azerbaijan, Iran, Germany, Turkhmenistan, Armenia and Georgia. It is important for foreign residents of Turkey to study the Turkish Language to communicate and integrate into the Turkish society. Regarding the students, Turkish is the working language at Agri Ibrahim Cecen University-that means it is necessary for the students to know the language to achieve their academic goals. There is a language center that provides language education to students. The instructors of the Turkish Second Language (TSL) center are also proficient in English and Russian languages.

Research centers

Ağrı İbrahim Çeçen University Historical Artifacts and Cultural-Nature Values Research and Application Center

International conferences
ICUA is the main host of scholarly international conferences related to Noah’s Ark in Eastern Anatolia. There were international symposia on Noah’s Ark and Mount Ağrı I and II, in 2010 and 2011.

Academic units

Faculties
Faculty of Education
Faculty of Science and Letters
Faculty of Economics and Administrative Sciences
Faculty of Islamic Sciences
Faculty of Pharmacy
Patnos Sultan Alpaslan Engineering and Natural Sciences Faculty

Institutes
Institute of Sciences
Institute of Social Sciences

High schools
School of Health
Eleşkirt Celal Oruç Animal Breeding School
School of Physical Education and Sports
School of Tourism and Hotel Management
School of Foreign Languages

Vocational schools
Vocational School of Health Services
Doğubeyazıt Ahmed-i Hani Vocational School
Patnos Vocational School
Taşlıçay Nurali Turan vocational School
Eleşkirt Vocational School

Research and application centers
Continuing Education Center
Central Research and Application Laboratory
Ahmed-i Hani Science, Culture and Art Center
The Research, Development, Application Center of Husbandry
The Research and Application Center of Historical Artifacts and Cultural Values of Nature
The Research and Application Center of Computer Sciences

Campuses 
There are two campuses located in Ağrı.
 East campus is near city center and includes health related schools.
 Main campus (West) is located on side of highway to Erzurum.

References

External links
 Official site (in English)

Universities and colleges in Turkey
Education in Ağrı
State universities and colleges in Turkey
Educational institutions established in 2007
Buildings and structures in Ağrı Province
2007 establishments in Turkey